Walzbachtal is a municipality in northwestern Karlsruhe district in Baden-Württemberg, Germany.

It was formed from the villages of Jöhlingen and Wössingen in 1971.

References

Karlsruhe (district)